Alluvioni Cambiò is a frazione of Alluvioni Piovera in the Province of Alessandria in the Italian region Piedmont, located about  east of Turin and about  northeast of Alessandria.

The name (alluvione meaning "flood" in Italian) refers to the numerous floods which struck the area, which is nearby the confluence of the Tanaro and Po Rivers and of the Scrivia river.

Twin towns — sister cities
Alluvioni Cambiò is twinned with:

  Vianne, France

External links
Official website

Cities and towns in Piedmont